Phnom Penh Municipality Television Channel 3 is a Cambodia television channel. The headquarters are located in Phnom Penh, Cambodia. The channel was established in 1996.
The owner of the channel is the municipal administration itself.

Appearances

Ident

Broadcast times
1996 – Started up at 5.30 am and signed off at 2 am every day.
1997–2004 – Started up at 5.30 am and signed off at 2 am (Sometimes signed off at 1.30 am or 2.30 am)
2005–present – Broadcast 24 hours everyday

See also
Media in Cambodia

References

External links
 Official Site

Television stations in Cambodia
Television channels and stations established in 1996
Mass media in Phnom Penh
1996 establishments in Cambodia